Maroua Dhaouadi (born May 22, 1992) is a Tunisian team handball player. She plays on the Tunisian national team, and participated at the 2011 World Women's Handball Championship in Brazil.

In 2012, she competed at the 2012 Women's Junior World Handball Championship in the Czech Republic.

References

1992 births
Living people
Tunisian female handball players